Wang Hanzhong (born 27 December 1963) is a Chinese rapeseed genetics and breeding engineer who is vice president of Chinese Academy of Agricultural Sciences, deputy leader of the Expert Steering Group for Whole Process Mechanization of Crop Production, Ministry of Agriculture and Rural Areas, and an academician of the Chinese Academy of Engineering.

Biography 
Wang was born in the town of Longtang in Lianyuan County, Hunan, on 27 December 1963. He earned a bachelor's degree in 1984, a master's degree in 1987, and a doctor's degree in 1990, all from Huazhong Agricultural University and all in crop genetic and breeding.

He was despatched to the Chinese Academy of Agricultural Sciences in July 1990, becoming director of the Institute of Oil Crops in August 1994 and director in June 1999. After this office was terminated in December 2014, he moved up the ranks to become vice president, concurrently serving as deputy leader of the Expert Steering Group for Whole Process Mechanization of Crop Production, Ministry of Agriculture and Rural Areas since May 2021.

Honours and awards 
 2006 State Science and Technology Progress Award (Second Class)
 2014 State Technological Invention Award (Second Class)
 27 November 2017 Member of the Chinese Academy of Engineering (CAE)

References 

1963 births
Living people
People from Lianyuan
Engineers from Hunan
Huazhong Agricultural University alumni
Members of the Chinese Academy of Engineering